Raymond Clare Archibald (7 October 1875 – 26 July 1955) was a prominent Canadian-American mathematician.  He is known for his work as a historian of mathematics, his editorships of mathematical journals and his contributions to the teaching of mathematics.

Biography
Raymond Clare Archibald was born in South Branch, Stewiacke, Nova Scotia on 7 October 1875. He was the son of Abram Newcomb Archibald (1849–1883) and Mary Mellish Archibald (1849–1901).  He was the fourth cousin twice removed of the famous Canadian-American astronomer and mathematician Simon Newcomb.

Archibald graduated in 1894 from Mount Allison College with B.A. degree in mathematics and teacher's certificate in violin.  After teaching mathematics and violin for a year at the Mount Allison Ladies' College he went to Harvard where he received a B.A. 1896 and a M.A. in 1897.  He then traveled to Europe where he attended the Humboldt University of Berlin during 1898 and received a Ph.D. cum laude from the University of Strasbourg in 1900.  His advisor was Karl Theodor Reye and title of his dissertation was The Cardioide and Some of its Related Curves.

He returned to Canada in 1900 and taught mathematics and violin at the Mount Allison Ladies' College until 1907.  After a one-year appointment at Acadia University he accepted an invitation of join the mathematics department at Brown University.  He stayed at Brown for the rest of his career becoming a Professor Emeritus in 1943.  While at Brown he created one of the finest mathematical libraries in the western hemisphere.

Archibald returned to Mount Allison in 1954 to curate the Mary Mellish Archibald Memorial Library, the library he had founded in 1905 to honor his mother.  At his death the library contained 23,000 volumes, 2,700 records, and 70,000 songs in American and English poetry and drama.

Raymond Clare Archibald was a world-renowned historian of mathematics with a lifelong concern for the teaching of mathematics in secondary schools.  At the presentation of his portrait to Brown University the head of the mathematics department, Professor Clarence Raymond Adams said of him:

"The instincts of the bibliophile were also his from early years.  Possessing a passion for accurate detail, systematic by nature and blessed with a memory that was the marvel of his friends, he gradually acquired a knowledge of mathematical books and their values which has scarcely been equalled.  This knowledge and an untiring energy he dedicated to the upbuilding of the mathematical library at Brown University.  From modest beginnings he has developed this essential equipment of the mathematical investigator to a point where it has no superior, in completeness and in convenience for the user."

Honors
Archibald received honorary degrees from the University of Padua (LL.D., 1922), Mount Allison University (LL.D., 1923) and from Brown University (M.A. ad eundem, 1943).
 Fellow, American Association for the Advancement of Science (1906)
 Member, Deutsche Mathematiker-Vereinigung (1908)
 Member, Edinburgh Mathematical Society (1909)
 Member, Mathematical Association (England) (1910)
 Member, Société Mathématique de France (1911)
 Member, London Mathematical Society (1912)
 Charter Member, Mathematical Association of America (1916); elected president for 1922
 Fellow, American Academy of Arts and Sciences (1917)
 Librarian, American Mathematical Society (1921-1941)
 Member, Circolo Matematico di Palermo (1922)
 Soci Fondatori, Unione Matematica Italiana (1924)
 Founding Member, History of Science Society (1924)
 Honorary Member, Society of Sciences, Cluj, Roumania (1929)
 Honorary Foreign Fellow, Masarykova Akademie Prace, Prague, Czecho-Slovakia (1930)
 Membre Effective, Académie Internationale d'Historie des Sciences (1931)
 Honorary Foreign Member, Polish Mathematical Society (1934)
 Honorary Member, New Brunswick Museum (1946)
 Honorary Member, Mathematical Association (England) (1949)

Editorships
 Associate editor, Bulletin of the American Mathematical Society (1913–20)
 Editor-in-chief, American Mathematical Monthly (1919–21); associate editor (1918–19)
 Associate editor, Revue Semestrielles des Publications Mathématiques (1923–34)
 Associate editor, Isis (1924–48)
 Associate editor, Scripta Mathematica (1932–49)
 Founder and editor, Mathematical Tables and Other Aids to Computation (1943–49)
 Co-founder and editor, Eudemes

Bibliography
Archibald's bibliography contains over 1,000 entries.   He contributed to over 20 different journals, mathematical, scientific, educational and literary.  The following are the books of which he is an author:
 Margaret Gordon, Lady Bannerman, Carlyle's First Love, John Lane, 1910, 
 Euclid's Book on Divisions of Figures: (Peri diairéseon biblion): with a restoration based on Woepcke's text and on the Practica geometriae of Leonardo Pisano, Cambridge University Press, 1916, 
 The Training of Teachers of Mathematics for the Secondary Schools of the Countries Represented in the International Commission on the Teaching of Mathematics, U.S. Government Printing Office, 1917
 Benjamin Peirce, 1809–1880. Biographical Sketch and Bibliography, Mathematical Association of America, 1925
 Bibliography of Egyptian and Babylonian Mathematics, Plandome Press, 1929
 History of Mathematics, Mathematical Association of America, 1931
 Outline of the History of Mathematics, The Lancaster Press, 1932
 Bibliography of the Life and Works of Simon Newcomb, J. Hope and & Sons, 1932
 A Semicentennial History of the American Mathematical Society, American Mathematical Society, 1938, 
 Mary Mellish Archibald Memory Library Guide for Students and Scholars, Mount Allison University, 1935–46
 Mathematical Table Makers, Scripta Mathematica, 1948
 Geometrical Constructions with a Ruler, Scripta Mathematica, 1950
 Historical Notes on the Education of Women at Mount Allison, 1854–1954, Mount Allison University, 1954
 Famous Problems of Elementary Geometry, Dover, 1955

Biographies
 Biographisch-Literarisches Handwörterbuch zur Geschichte der Exacten Wissenschaften Enthaltend Nachweisungen über Lebensverhältnisse und Leitstunger von Mathematikern, Astronomen, Physikern, Chemikern, Mineralogen, Geologen usw. aller Völker und Zeiten ("Poggendorff"), 1904/22 and 1923/31
 American Men of Science, 1905 though 1955
 The Canadian Men and Women of the Time, 1912
 Who's Who in Science, International, 1913
 Who's Who in America, 1914/15 though 1954/55
 Who's Who, 1922 though 1955
 Encyclopædia Britannica, 1929
 Who's Who in American Education, 1935/36, with portrait
 The Compendium of American Genealogy, First Families of America, 1937
 The Canadian Who's Who, 1937/38 though 1952/54
 Who's Who in New England, 1916, 1938, 1948
 The National Cyclopaedia of American Biography, 1938
 Who's Who Among North American Authors, 1927/28 though 1936/40
 Leaders in Education: A Biographical Directory, 1941
 Directory of American Scholars. A Biographical Directory, 1942
 Who's Who in the East, 1948 though 1953
 World Biography, 1948 and 1954
 The Author's & Writer's Who's Who, 1949
 Who knows, and what, among authorities, experts, and the specially informed, 1949
 The International Who is Who in Music, 1951
 The New Century Cyclopedia of Names, 1954
 Who Was Who. 1951–1960, 1964
 Who Was Who in America. 1951–1960, 1964.
 International Personal Bibliographie, 1800—1943
 Enciclopedia Universal Ilustrada Europeo-Americana, Madrid, 1905—1930
 Internationale Bibliographie der Zeitschriftenliteratur aus allen Gebieten des Wissens
 A Bio-Bibliographical Finding List of Canadian Musicians
 Isis Cumulative Bibliography
 MacTutor
 Harvard College Class of 1896. Fiftieth Anniversary Report, 1946

Further reading
 Jim Tattersall and Shawnee McMurran, Raymond Clare Archibald: A Euterpean Historian of Mathematics, New England Math J., v.~36, n. 2, May 2004, p. 31—47.
 Cheryl White Ennals, Raymond Clare Archibald---Collector: The Legacy of a Scholar's Labor of Love, in The Book Disease: Atlantic Provinces Book Collectors, ed. Eric L. Swanick, London: The Vine Press, 1996, p. 99-117.

References

External links

 
 

Brown University faculty
19th-century American mathematicians
20th-century American mathematicians
Canadian mathematicians
Harvard University alumni
Humboldt University of Berlin alumni
Mount Allison University alumni
Presidents of the Mathematical Association of America
American historians of mathematics
History of mathematics
Mathematical tables
1875 births
1955 deaths
Canadian expatriates in the United States
Canadian expatriates in Germany
The American Mathematical Monthly editors